Puerto Rico competed at the 2004 Summer Olympics in Athens, Greece, from 13 to 29 August 2004. This was the nation's fifteenth consecutive appearance at the Olympics.

Puerto Rico Olympic Committee sent the nation's largest delegation to the Games since 1992 due to the presence of the men's basketball team. A total of 43 athletes, 32 men and 11 women, had competed in 15 sports, roughly larger by two thirds of the nation's team size from the previous Games. Five Puerto Rican athletes had previously competed in Sydney, including four-time Olympian and Tornado sailor Enrique Figueroa and freestyle swimmer and two-time Olympic finalist Ricardo Busquets. Men's basketball was the only team-based sport in which Puerto Rico had its representation at these Games. Because of the nation's emerging presence to the team sport, team captain and NBA's Utah Jazz player Carlos Arroyo was appointed by the committee to carry the Puerto Rican flag in the opening ceremony. Puerto Rico also marked its Olympic debut in synchronized swimming and taekwondo.

Puerto Rico left Athens without receiving a single Olympic medal for the second consecutive time. Figueroa and his new partner Jorge Hernández achieved the nation's highest placement at these Games after finishing seventh in the Tornado class. Meanwhile, Mabel Fonseca originally claimed the fifth position in women's wrestling, but she committed an anti-doping violation, as she was tested positive for the steroid stanozolol. Despite not winning a medal, the men’s basketball team secured a notable victory against the United States. The Puerto Ricans’ convincing 92-73 win against the three-time defending gold medalists was the United States team’s first Olympic loss since it began including NBA players in 1992, only its third Olympic loss overall, and as of 2021, its most lopsided Olympic loss ever.

Athletics

Puerto Rican athletes have so far achieved qualifying standards in the following athletics events (up to a maximum of 3 athletes in each event at the 'A' Standard, and 1 at the 'B' Standard).

Men
Track & road events

Combined events – Decathlon

Women
Track & road events

Basketball

Men's tournament

Roster

Group play

Quarterfinals

Classification match (5th–6th place)

Boxing

Puerto Rico sent five boxers to Athens.

Christian Rosario

Diving

Women

Equestrian

Show jumping

Gymnastics

Artistic
Men

Judo

Three Puerto Rican judoka (two men and one woman) qualified for the 2004 Summer Olympics.

Sailing

Puerto Rican sailors have qualified one boat for each of the following events.

Women

Open

M = Medal race; OCS = On course side of the starting line; DSQ = Disqualified; DNF = Did not finish; DNS= Did not start; RDG = Redress given

Shooting 

Men

Swimming

Puerto Rican swimmers earned qualifying standards in the following events (up to a maximum of 2 swimmers in each event at the A-standard time, and 1 at the B-standard time):

Men

Women

Synchronized swimming

Two Puerto Rican synchronized swimmers qualified a spot in the women's duet.

Taekwondo

Puerto Rico has qualified a single taekwondo jin.

Tennis

Puerto Rico nominated a female tennis player to compete in the tournament.

Volleyball

Beach

Wrestling

Women's freestyle

See also

 Puerto Rico at the 2003 Pan American Games
 Puerto Rico at the 2004 Summer Paralympics

References

External links
Official Report of the XXVIII Olympiad
Puerto Rico Olympic Committee 

Nations at the 2004 Summer Olympics
2004 Summer Olympics
Summer Olympics